Stephanie Vogt (born 15 February 1990) is a retired tennis player from Liechtenstein.

In her career, Vogt won two doubles titles on the WTA Tour, as well as 12 singles titles and 11 doubles titles on the ITF Circuit. On 24 February 2014, she reached her best singles ranking of world No. 137. On 22 February 2016, she peaked at No. 69 in the WTA doubles rankings.

Playing for Liechtenstein Fed Cup team, Vogt achieved a win–loss record of 23–18.

Biography
Vogt was born on 15 February 1990 to parents Erika and Ewald (the latter died 2007). She began playing tennis at age five. After playing with the Swiss junior team for some time, she turned professional in 2006, and simultaneously decided to move to Hungary to train with Zoltan Kuharszky, which would result in reaching the mid-200s of the WTA rankings in 2008. She was awarded an invitation spot at the 2008 Summer Olympics in Beijing, but she was forced to withdraw due to a patella injury, which further required surgery. Knee rehabilitation took approximately 18 months, during which Vogt finished school before returning to the professional circuit in 2011. Vogt was given the honor of being Liechtenstein's flag bearer during the 2012 Summer Olympics in London and also represented Liechtenstein at the 2016 Summer Olympics. By the time of her retirement in August 2016, she was the highest-ranked tennis player to ever represent her country.

Career
Vogt had a successful junior career, winning five ITF singles titles, as well as six doubles titles. Her career-high world ranking as a junior was world No. 5, and she finished her junior career with a record of 79–26.

Her success on the ITF Women's Circuit in 2008 led to the ITF announcing that she had been given one of the two invitations into the main draw for the Summer Olympics in Beijing. However, she was forced to withdraw through injury and was replaced by Tamarine Tanasugarn.

2010–2011
She reached six ITF singles finals, winning three in Egypt, Slovenia, and the Netherlands. She also reached five ITF doubles finals, losing all five. At the 2011 Games of the Small States of Europe, held in Liechtenstein, Vogt won three gold medals. She defeated Kathinka von Deichmann in the final of the singles, whilst also partnering with von Deichmann to win the women's doubles. The mixed doubles was won with Jirka Lokaj. This built on her success from the 2007 Games, when she won a gold medal in the singles, before combining with Marina Novak to take silver in the doubles. She did not participate in the 2009 event.

2012
Vogt represented Liechtenstein also at the London Summer Olympics. Ranked No. 236, she did not qualify through rankings and was thus given a Tripartite Commission Invitation to play in the singles draw. In the first round, she played against Anna Tatishvili of Georgia and lost, 2–6, 0–6. On the ITF Circuit, she won two tournaments in doubles, in Bath and Aschaffenburg, and reached the singles final at Netanya, losing to Anna Karolína Schmiedlová in three sets.

2013: First WTA Tour title
In July, she won her biggest title to date in Biarritz, where she beat Schmiedlová in three sets. Following this win, Vogt cracked the top 150 for the first time in her career. She was in touching distance of a main-draw berth at the French Open, defeating two players in qualifying before losing out to Barbora Záhlavová-Strýcová in straight sets. One month later, she won another singles title in Podgorica by beating Anett Kontaveit in the final, 6–4, 6–3.

In October, she took part in the qualifying of the WTA Linz Open in Austria, where she defeated Christina McHale in the first round, 7–5, 6–3, but lost in the second against Katarzyna Piter, in a narrow three-setter. In the doubles, she teamed with Yanina Wickmayer, losing to the pair of Mona Barthel and Irina-Camelia Begu, in the super tie-breaker. The following week, she played the qualifying for the WTA tournament in Luxembourg, she beat Melanie South in the first round, 6–1, 6–2, but lost in the second round against Alison Van Uytvanck, in three sets. In the first round of the doubles, she partnered again with Yanina Wickmayer, and they defeated the pairing of Lourdes Domínguez Lino and Monica Niculescu. In the quarterfinals, they beat Līga Dekmeijere and Christina McHale. They were supposed to face Polona Hercog and Lisa Raymond in the semifinals but the other pair were forced to withdraw. So they entered the final in Luxembourg, and faced Kristina Barrois and Laura Thorpe, winning in two sets.

2015
In April, Vogt played in Stuttgart, Germany but lost in the first round to Kateřina Siniaková. Playing doubles with Petra Martic, she reached the semifinals before she and Martic were beaten by Bethanie Mattek-Sands and Lucie Šafářová. In the first round, they beat the team of Martina Hingis and Sania Mirza.

In July, she bowed out in the semifinals of the German tournament in Versmold. She then bowed out in the first round of qualifying for Bad Gastein in Austria but won the doubles title there with Danka Kovinic.

2016: Retirement
In January, she won the doubles tournament in Hong Kong, along with Viktorija Golubic. She then bowed out in the first qualifying round of the Australian Open as she lost to Arina Rodionova, in straight sets. In doubles, she and her partner, Maria Sanchez, got through to the main draw of the tournament where they beat Darija Jurak and Nicole Melichar, in three sets in the first round, making this Vogt's first victory in the final table of a Grand Slam championship. Vogt did bow out sharply, however, in the second round when she and Sanchez lost to Caroline Garcia and Kristina Mladenovic, 2–6, 1–6.

In August, Vogt participated in her second Olympics where she lost in the first round to Johanna Konta, in straight sets. Afterwards, she announced her retirement from professional tennis.

WTA career finals

Doubles: 2 (2 titles)

ITF Circuit finals

Singles: 19 (12 titles, 7 runner-ups)

Doubles: 27 (11 titles, 16 runner-ups)

Fed Cup participation

Singles

Doubles

References

External links
 
 
 

1990 births
Living people
People from Vaduz
Expatriate sportspeople in Hungary
Liechtenstein female tennis players
Tennis players at the 2012 Summer Olympics
Tennis players at the 2016 Summer Olympics
Olympic tennis players of Liechtenstein